Eric Hope (17 January 1915 – 2 August 1999) was a British pianist.

Born in Stratford-upon-Avon, Warwickshire, of Baltic descent, he was a pupil at Warwick School, 1931-34. He studied piano playing in London under Kathleen Arnold. He died in Nottingham in 1999.

Publications
Handbook of Piano Playing, Students' Music Library, Dobson Books Ltd, December 1955, 
Aids to technique: Muscular development exercises for pianists and other instrumentalists, Edwin Ashdown, 1962 
Basic Piano Exercises, Edwin Ashdown, 1963

References

 Obituary in The Portcullis, the Chronicle of Warwick School, October 1999.

1915 births
1999 deaths
People educated at Warwick School
British classical pianists
British conscientious objectors
20th-century British pianists
20th-century British musicians